Dublin Swift may refer to
 HSC Dublin Swift - A High Speed Craft operated by Irish Ferries since 2018
 HSC Cecilia Payne - A High Speed Craft, formerly known as the Jonathan Swift